Whitehead is a small community in the Canadian province of Nova Scotia, located in the Municipality of the District of Guysborough in Guysborough County. As of 2011 the population of Whitehead consists of between 50 and 120 people. The location and geography of Whitehead is very typical of a coastal fishing village, in that it has various large rockformations and many small islands surrounding it. The harbour is protected by islands and points extending out into the bay from either side. Whitehead experiences large amounts of fog due to its relative location. Each year during the second week in August the annual Whitehead Days festival is held, with a parade, games for children, a beer garden, and many other attractions.

References
Whitehead on Destination Nova Scotia

Communities in Guysborough County, Nova Scotia
General Service Areas in Nova Scotia